Power Corporation of Canada is a management and holding company that focuses on financial services in North America, Europe and Asia. Its core holdings are insurance, retirement, wealth management and investment management, including a portfolio of alternative investment platforms.

History
Power Corporation of Canada was formed in 1925 by two stockbrokers – Arthur J. Nesbitt and his partner, Peter A.T. Thomson. Nesbitt served as the company's first president. Power Corporation was created as a holding company to manage their substantial investments in public utility companies involved in the electrical power industry in Quebec's Eastern Townships, plus in the other Canadian provinces of Ontario, Manitoba, New Brunswick and British Columbia. In the latter part of the 1930s, the company acquired a controlling interest in Bathurst Pulp and Paper Company Ltd., and in 1938 Canadian Oil Companies Ltd., selling the latter to Shell Oil Company in 1962.

In 1952, Arthur J. Nesbitt was succeeded as president by his son, Arthur Deane Nesbitt (1910–1978). The Nesbitt family sold most of its interest in Power Corporation to the Paul Desmarais group in 1968 and by 1970 no longer had any involvement.

In 1975, Power Corporation attempted a takeover of the Argus Corporation holding company which had substantial interests in brewing, food retailing, farm implements manufacturing, paper products and other businesses. The Argus owners rejected the takeover attempt and decided to retain their voting shares, while 50% of the non-voting shares were purchased by Power Corp. In 1976, ten percent of the voting shares were sold by E.P. Taylor to Desmarais. Argus was eventually sold in 1978 to a Conrad Black-controlled firm.
In 1989, corporation began supporting the Imagine Canada program.

While Power Corporation was originally established as an electric utility holding company, the company became a conglomerate with interests in the finance industry, as well as interests in other business sectors such as sustainable and renewable energy. 1984 saw the creation of a management and holding company, Power Financial Corporation. Expansion for the group began in the 1970s in Europe and followed in the 1990s in Asia. The group's involvement in the finance sector continued in 2000 with the acquisition of Canada Life, Mackenzie Financial and Putnam Investments. Following the 2020 reorganization, Power Corporation owns 100% of Power Financial’s common shares.

In 2002, Power Corporation created the Sagard SAS fund, then Sagard Capital Partners, later named Sagard Holdings, in 2004 in the United States. R. Jeffrey Orr was named Power Financial Corporation CEO in 2005. By 2007, IGM Financial was the holding company for Power Corporation's investment fund companies. Power Corporation also by 2009 had interests in the parent company of La Presse, Mackenzie Financial, London Life Insurance, Canada Life Assurance, Great-West Life, and Putnam Investments.

The company reduced its number of board directors in 2008 from 21 to 12. Power Corporation acquired a stake in China Asset Management in 2011, purchasing 10% from CITIC Securities Co. Also that year, Power Corporation's new fund Sagard China was founded. Through a number of recent initiatives, in partnership with its subsidiaries Great-West Lifeco and IGM Financial, the Power Corporation group has been actively participating in the emerging fintech industry. This fintech strategy is achieved through Portag3 (which created Canada’s largest fintech investment fund), Wealthsimple, Personal Capital and Diagram.

In connection with the reorganization, Paul Desmarais Jr. and André Desmarais retired as co-chief executive officers of Power Corporation after 24 years in the roles and continue to serve as chairman and deputy chairman, respectively, of Power Corporation's board of directors. R. Jeffrey Orr, president and chief executive officer of Power Financial, become president and chief executive officer of Power Corporation, effective February 13, 2020.

Politics
The corporation has been criticized for its influence on Canadian politics through its relationships with prominent politicians, including several prime ministers and provincial premiers. Critics "occasionally charge that the family’s political connections give it unfair advantages," says the New York Times in 2007. The company has been known to defend federalism in Quebec.

Paul Desmarais Jr., was one of thirty members of the North American Competitiveness Council, a group whose advice directed the policies of Security and Prosperity Partnership of North America (SPP).

Several former Canadian prime ministers have occupied a position on the management team or on the board of Power Corporation, of one of its group companies or of its international advisory council :

- Former Prime Minister of Canada Paul Martin was hired in the 1960s to work for Paul Desmarais Sr. by Maurice Strong. Martin became president of Canada Steamship Lines, a subsidiary of Power Corp., and in 1981 Desmarais sold the company to Martin and a partner. Martin went on to make his personal fortune as an owner of CSL.

- Former Prime Minister of Canada Jean Chrétien sat on the board of Power Corp. subsidiary Consolidated Bathurst in the late 1980s, before he became the leader of the Liberal Party of Canada. Chrétien's daughter France is married to the son of Paul Desmarais, André.

- Chrétien's long-time aide and chief policy advisor Eddie Goldenberg also worked in the past for Power Corp. John Rae, strategist for Chretien, served as Power Corp.'s executive vice president. His is the brother of former interim Liberal Party of Canada Leader Bob Rae.

- Former prime minister of Canada Pierre Trudeau served in the mid-1990s on Power Corp.'s international advisory board. Trudeau's assistant Ted Johnson also worked for Power Corp. During the Trudeau administration, Michael Pitfield held a variety of positions in government, but during his time in the private sector, he was at one time a vice-chairman of Power Corp.

- Former prime minister of Canada Brian Mulroney also has a relationship with Power Corporation. Mulroney's friend Ian MacDonald described Desmarais as "Mulroney's mentor in the business world", and it is believed that Mulroney has done legal work for Power Corp. since the end of his term as Prime Minister. Additionally, former Mulroney Minister of Transport Don Mazankowski served as Power Corp.'s company director.

- Former premiers of Ontario Bill Davis and John Robarts of the Progressive Conservatives have both sat on Power Corp.'s national advisory board.

- Former premier of Quebec Daniel Johnson Jr. worked for Power Corp. from 1973 to 1981, and in the last three years of this term was a vice president of the company.

- Former member of the Liberal Party of Canada Maurice Strong became president of Power Corp. by his mid-thirties. He had a role in the creation of the Canadian International Development Agency, and in 1976, he was appointed to run Petro-Canada. He later worked for the United Nations.

- Power Corp.'s international advisory board has featured individuals such as former German Chancellor Helmut Schmidt, former oil minister of Saudi Arabia Sheikh Ahmed Zaki Yamani, former head of the US Federal Reserve Board Paul Volcker, and the previously mentioned former Prime Minister of Canada Pierre Trudeau.

- The former Caisse de dépôt et placement du Québec's president and CEO, acted as the vice chairman of both Power Corporation and Power Financial Corporation starting in 2009 until January 2018.

See also 
 List of United States insurance companies
 List of Canadian insurance companies

References

Bibliography

External links
Official website

 
Conglomerate companies of Canada
Insurance companies of Canada
Investment companies of Canada
Newspaper companies of Canada
Pulp and paper companies of Canada
Companies based in Montreal
Morningstar National Bank Québec Index
Energy companies established in 1925
Financial services companies established in 1925
Conglomerate companies established in 1925
Canadian companies established in 1925
1925 establishments in Quebec
Companies listed on the Toronto Stock Exchange
S&P/TSX 60